Mecklenburg County Courthouse may refer to:

 Mecklenburg County Courthouse (North Carolina), listed on the National Register of Historic Places (NRHP)
 Mecklenburg County Courthouse (Virginia), listed on the NRHP in Mecklenburg County, Virginia